Smolné Pece is a municipality and village in Karlovy Vary District in the Karlovy Vary Region of the Czech Republic. It has about 200 inhabitants.

History
Smolné Pece was established in 1872.

References

Villages in Karlovy Vary District